Anaparthi Mandal is one of the 19 mandals in East Godavari District of Andhra Pradesh. As per census 2011, there are 9 villages.

Demographics 
Anaparthi Mandal has total population of 70,859 as per the Census 2011 out of which 35,395 are males while 35,464 are females and the average Sex Ratio of Anaparthi Mandal is 1,002. The total literacy rate of Anaparthy Mandal is 72.37%. The male literacy rate is 69.02% and the female literacy rate is 62.3%.

Towns & Villages

Villages 

Anaparthi
Duppalapudi
Koppavaram
Kutukuluru
Mahendrawada
Pedaparthi
Polamuru
Pulagurtha
Ramavaram

See also 
List of mandals in Andhra Pradesh

References 

Mandals in East Godavari district